Snoopadelic Films (formerly known as Doggfather Ent.) is an American film production company, founded by rapper Snoop Dogg in 2005, and distributed through MCA. Its primary profile is endorsing and releasing DVDs related to Snoop Dogg.

Crew 
Dylan C. "Pook" Brown - director
Calvin Broadus - producer

Movies

Endorsements
Tha Eastsidaz (DVD) (2000) (Double Platinum)
Snoop Dogg's Hustlaz: Diary of a Pimp (DVD) (2002)

Production 
Snoop Dogg presents... Welcome to the House - The Doggumentary (DVD) (2002)
Boss'n Up (DVD) (2005)
Hood of Horror (2006)
Reincarnated (2013)
Martha & Snoop's Potluck Dinner Party (TV) (2016)
Snoop Dogg Presents The Joker's Wild (2018)
Go-Big Show (2021)

Videos 
Latoiya Williams - Fallen Star (excerpt from The Doggumentary)

Books 
Love Don't Live Here No More, Doggy Tales Vol.1

References 

 SnoopDogg.com

Film production companies of the United States
Snoop Dogg
Entertainment companies based in California
Companies based in Los Angeles County, California
Claremont, California
American companies established in 2005
Entertainment companies established in 2005
2005 establishments in California